Jack Ashley, Baron Ashley of Stoke,  (6 December 1922 – 20 April 2012) was a British politician. He was a Labour Member of Parliament in the House of Commons for Stoke-on-Trent South for 26 years, from 1966 to 1992, and subsequently sat in the House of Lords. He was a long-time campaigner for disabled people.

Early life and education 
Ashley was born in Widnes and educated at Warrington Road School. He left school at 14 to work in the chemical process industry.  He became a crane driver and was a shop steward in the Chemical Workers' Union, a union of which he was the youngest executive member aged 22.  He served in the Army in the Second World War, and then won a scholarship to study at Ruskin College, where he received a Diploma in Economics and Political Science in 1948.

He continued his studies at Gonville and Caius College, Cambridge, where he was President of the Cambridge Union Society in 1951.  He worked as a research worker for the National Union of General and Municipal Workers and then worked as a radio producer for the North American Service and BBC Home Service. In 1956 he joined the BBC television service and worked as a producer on Panorama and Monitor.

Member of Parliament 
He served on Widnes Borough Council as a councillor from 1946. At the 1951 general election, Ashley contested Finchley without success. He was elected as Member of Parliament (MP) for Stoke-on-Trent South at the 1966 general election.  In December 1967, at the age of 45, as a result of complications of a routine ear operation to correct a mild hearing loss caused by a perforated eardrum early in his working career, he became profoundly deaf. He described the event as "rather like being struck by lightning". He prepared to resign his seat, but was persuaded instead to take a crash-course in lip-reading. Several weeks later he returned to the House, the United Kingdom's first totally deaf MP and said to be the only totally deaf member of parliament in the world. Later, he used a palantype transcription system developed by Alan Newell, Andrew Downton and others at the University of Southampton – this allowed a palantype secretary seated in the public gallery to type what was being said in real time and Ashley could read the transcribed English text from a discreetly-placed monitor at his seat.

The first known use of the term "domestic violence" in a modern context, meaning violence in the home, was by Ashley in an address to Parliament in 1973 in which he noted the pioneering work of campaigner Erin Pizzey, founder of the first domestic violence shelter. The term previously referred primarily to civil unrest, violence from within a country as opposed to violence perpetrated by a foreign power.

Disability campaigner 
He became a tireless campaigner for disabled people, especially those who were deaf or blind, and won broad cross-party sympathy, support and respect in parliament for his approach. In 1972, he sponsored the pivotal motion in the House of Commons making a distinction between legal and moral obligation. The success of this enabled The Sunday Times to continue its moral campaign for improved compensation for children disabled by thalidomide even while the parents' legal case was still technically in the courts. His Labour colleague Alf Morris (later Lord Morris of Manchester) was also a supporter. The editor of The Sunday Times, Harold Evans, later wrote in Good Times, Bad Times how Ashley selflessly gave up writing his autobiography so as to concentrate on the thalidomide campaign. He also campaigned for compensation for vaccine damage and for damage caused by the arthritis drug Opren. He became a Companion of Honour in the 1975 New Year Honours, and joined the Privy Council in 1979.

He also received a Doctor of Humane Letters from the Gallaudet University, the world's only university for the deaf, in 1975 for his efforts on behalf of deaf and hard-of-hearing persons.

Ashley's ability to follow the proceedings of the House of Commons helped inspire the development of live captioning on television to benefit the deaf and hard-of-hearing. He had the ability to read the output from the stenographers who were reporting the debates. When Ashley visited the BBC's Ceefax department around 1975, this ability gave one of the staff the idea of commissioning a Southampton University doctoral student to develop a computer programme that would convert stenographic output to normal printed text as subtitles to television programmes. Later, Ashley also used the technique to follow parliamentary debates on a small monitor .

Ashley received an Honorary Doctorate from Heriot-Watt University in 1979.

In 1986, Ashley and his wife founded the charity Defeating Deafness, now known as Deafness Research UK. He retired from the House of Commons at the 1992 general election and was created a life peer as Baron Ashley of Stoke, of Widnes in the County of Cheshire on 10 July 1992. He received a cochlear implant in 1993 which restored much of his hearing.

He was the subject of This Is Your Life in October 1974 when he was surprised by Eamonn Andrews while playing badminton in the back garden of his home in Epsom.

Personal life 
Ashley married Pauline Kay Crispin (1932–2003) in 1951; she died aged 70 in Surrey. They had three daughters, including journalist Jackie Ashley. His son-in-law was television presenter Andrew Marr through Marr's marriage to Jackie.

Ashley contracted pneumonia, and died on 20 April 2012, at the age of 89.

Notes

References

External links 
 
Obituary at bbc.co.uk
Biography from Deafness Research UK

Short biography from Gallaudet University

1922 births
2012 deaths
Alumni of Gonville and Caius College, Cambridge
Alumni of Ruskin College
BBC television producers
British Army personnel of World War II
Councillors in Cheshire
Deaf politicians
Deaf royalty and nobility
GMB (trade union)-sponsored MPs
Labour Party (UK) MPs for English constituencies
Ashley of Stoke
Members of the Order of the Companions of Honour
Members of the Privy Council of the United Kingdom
People from Widnes
British politicians with disabilities
Presidents of the Cambridge Union
UK MPs 1966–1970
UK MPs 1970–1974
UK MPs 1974
UK MPs 1974–1979
UK MPs 1979–1983
UK MPs 1983–1987
UK MPs 1987–1992
Deaths from pneumonia in the United Kingdom
English deaf people
British Army soldiers
Military personnel from Lancashire
Life peers created by Elizabeth II